Hollebeke Mountain is located on the border of Alberta and British Columbia on the Continental Divide. It was named in 1917 after Hollebeke, a village in Belgium.

See also
 List of peaks on the Alberta–British Columbia border
 List of mountains of Alberta
 Mountains of British Columbia

References

Hollebeke Mountain
Hollebeke Mountain
Canadian Rockies